USCGC Iroquois (WHEC-43) was an Owasco-class high-endurance cutter built for World War II service with the United States Coast Guard. The war ended before the ship was completed and consequently she never saw wartime service.

Iroquois was built by Western Pipe & Steel at the company's San Pedro shipyard. Named after Lake Iroquois (Vermont), she was commissioned as a patrol gunboat with ID number WPG-43 on 9 February 1946. Her ID was later changed to WHEC-43 (HEC for "High Endurance Cutter" - the "W" signifies a Coast Guard vessel).

Operational history

Iroquois was assigned to Honolulu, Hawaii.  In February 1951 she served on Ocean Station Nan; July through August 1951 she served on Ocean Station Uncle; October–November 1951 she served on Ocean Station Victor; in January 1952 she served on Ocean Station Uncle; June 1952 she served on Ocean Station Queen; From December 1952 through January 1953 she served on Ocean Station Victor; In February 1953 on Ocean Station Sugar; in June–July 1953 on Ocean Station Queen; in August 1953 she served on Ocean Station Queen.

Run aground with major damage
While departing Midway on 29 June 1954 Iriquois ran aground on a reef.  She was refloated on 1 July but had sustained major damage to her hull.  She was towed to the Coast Guard Yard, decommissioned and stored through 13 January 1965.  Both of her boiler burners were removed and installed on board her sister cutter, Escanaba.  Iroquois was eventually sold for scrap.

References
Iriquois WHEC-43, United States' Coast Guard website.
Scheina, Robert L.: U.S. Coast Guard Cutters & Craft of World War II Annapolis: Naval Institute Press, 1981, pp. 1–3.
Scheina, Robert L.: U.S. Coast Guard Cutters & Craft, 1946-1990 Annapolis: Naval Institute Press, 1990, pp. 18–26.

Owasco-class cutters
Ships of the United States Coast Guard
Ships built in Los Angeles
1944 ships